The following is the filmography of English director and producer Ridley Scott, mostly known for directing The Martian (2015)

Films 
As director

Television
Developer
2012: Coma
2013: Killing Lincoln
2013: Killing Kennedy
2015: Killing Jesus

Producer
2005–2010: Numbers

Executive producer
2009–2016: The Good Wife 
2010: The Pillars of the Earth 
2011: Prophets of Science Fiction 
2011: Gettysburg 
2012: Britain in a Day 
2012: World Without End 
2012: Labyrinth 
2014: Halo: Nightfall 
2015–2019: The Man in the High Castle 
2016–2017: Mercy Street 
2016: BrainDead 
2017: Taboo 
2017–2022: The Good Fight 
2018–2019: The Terror 
2019: The Passage
2019: A Christmas Carol
2020–2022: Raised by Wolves (also directed 2 episodes)
2023: Kaleidoscope
2023: Still Missing Morgan

Commercials

1973: Bike Round for Hovis
1979: Chanel... Share the fantasy. for Chanel
1984: 1984 for Apple Computer
1986:  for W.R. Grace
1986: The Choice of a New Generation for Pepsi (Starred Don Johnson and Glenn Frey)
1992: Nissan 300ZX Twin Turbo Super Bowl commercial
1995: Hutchison Telecom Future Thoughts RSA / Orange Telecom
1995: "La Légende de Quézac"
2012: Fame for Lady Gaga Fame (Executive producer)
2012: Coca-Cola's The Polar Bears (producer)
2016:  for IBM
2019: The Journey for Turkish Airlines

References 

Director filmographies
British filmographies
Ridley Scott